WASP-46 is a G-type main-sequence star about 1240 light-years away. The star is older than Sun and is strongly depleted in heavy elements compared to Sun, having just 45% of solar abundance. Despite its advanced age, the star is rotating rapidly, being spun up by the tides raised by giant planet on close orbit.

The star is displaying an excess ultraviolet emission associated with starspot activity, and suspected to be surrounded by dust and debris disk.

Planetary system
In 2011 a transiting hot superjovian planet b  was detected. The re-measurement of dayside planetary temperature in 2020 has resulted in lower readings of 1870 K.

In 2017, a search for transit-timing variation of WASP-46b yielded zero results, thus ruling out existence of additional gas giants in the system. The orbital decay of WASP-46b was also not detected.

References

Indus (constellation)
G-type main-sequence stars
Planetary systems with one confirmed planet
Planetary transit variables
J21145687-5552184